WDMV is a broadcast radio station licensed to Walkersville, Maryland, serving the Metro Washington area.  WDMV is owned and operated by Birach Broadcasting Corporation.

History

The WDMV call letters were first assigned to the 540 AM radio station in Pocomoke City, Md., on the Delmarva Peninsula in the mid-1950s.  The station went on the air in 1955 as WDVM and the later call letter change to WDMV reflected their "Wonderful Delmarva" logo. Eddie Matherly, known as "Mama's Country Youngin," was an icon during the station's country music days in the mid-1950s. Then came "Delmarvarama" for several years featuring a mix of all-time pop music favorites. Ownership and format changes have dotted the Pocomoke City station's history.

Until 2002, AM 700 had been WWTL with an Arabic music/talk format, but in the aftermath of 9/11 a quick change to conservative talk "WGOP" happened.  This lasted for a few years when the WGOP calls moved to sister station AM 540, and AM 700 became WDMV.  Since then WDMV's has gone brokered featuring various formats over the years including ethnic programming, business talk and Spanish programming.

WDMV shuts down at sundown to protect clear channel WLW, which also broadcasts on AM 700.

WDMV went off the air on February 6, 2009.  Its operator, National Radio Corporation, has filed for bankruptcy in the U.S. Bankruptcy Court for the Eastern District of Virginia.  WDMV came back on the air on January 11, 2010, with a Classic Oldies format.  On January 26, 2010, the station switched to a Spanish Oldies format. On March 23, 2010, WDMV went silent (off the air).  In April 2011 WDMV returned to the air with Spanish programming as "La Jefa".

On April 6, 2017, WDMV was granted a construction permit to upgrade to 50 kW daytime. The application was held up for some eleven years while Birach unsuccessfully attempted to move WGOP to Damascus, Maryland.

References

External links

DMV
Birach Broadcasting Corporation stations
Middle Eastern-American culture in Maryland
DMV
DMV
Radio stations established in 1955
1955 establishments in Maryland